Charles Joseph Rae (1819 – 7 February 1894) was a New Zealand painter, journalist and labour reformer. He was born in London, England in about 1819. He was the initial promoter of the Christchurch Mechanics' Institute, out of which the Christchurch City Libraries have developed. One of his sons, Arthur Rae, became a Senator for New South Wales.

References

1819 births
1894 deaths
New Zealand activists
New Zealand farmers
English emigrants to New Zealand
New Zealand journalists
People from Christchurch
19th-century journalists
Male journalists
19th-century New Zealand painters
19th-century New Zealand male artists
19th-century male writers